The Burtner House (also known as the Burtner Stone House) is an historic home which is located on Burtner Road in Harrison Township, Allegheny County, Pennsylvania in the United States. 

It was added to the National Register of Historic Places in 1972.

History and architectural features
Built between 1818 and 1821 by Phillip Burtner, along Little Bull Creek, the property was originally a working farm and residence of the Burtner family. Through the years, it served as an election polling station and as the setting for town meetings, including the discussions that lead to the construction of the Pennsylvania Canal. The house served four generations of the Burtner family. 

Spared from demolition prior to the construction of Pennsylvania Route 28, the Burtner House was added to the National Register of Historic Places in 1972, and to the List of Pittsburgh History and Landmarks Foundation Historic Landmarks in 1975.  

The site is home to an annual strawberry festival in June and an annual harvest festival.

References

External links
Burtner House website

Houses on the National Register of Historic Places in Pennsylvania
Houses in Allegheny County, Pennsylvania
Historic house museums in Pennsylvania
Houses completed in 1821
1820s architecture in the United States
History of Allegheny County, Pennsylvania
Museums in Allegheny County, Pennsylvania
Pittsburgh History & Landmarks Foundation Historic Landmarks
National Register of Historic Places in Allegheny County, Pennsylvania